George Underwood may refer to:

 George Allen Underwood (1793–1829), English architect
 George V. Underwood Jr. (1913–1984), U.S. Army general
 George Underwood (artist) (born 1947), English artist and musician
 George Underwood (athlete) (1884–1943), American athlete
 George Underwood, recorded by Domino Records